The Hallyburton Johnstone Shield is the premier domestic women's one-day cricket competition in New Zealand. The tournament began in 1935–36, as a first-class competition, but is now played as a 50-over competition, with six provincial teams taking part: Auckland, Canterbury, Central Districts, Northern Districts, Otago and Wellington. The tournament now runs alongside the Twenty20 Women's Super Smash.

The most successful side in the history of the competition are Canterbury, with 38 outright title wins and 1 shared title. The holders are Wellington, who beat Canterbury in the final of the 2022–23 season.

History
The tournament began in 1935–36, as the Hallyburton Johnstone Challenge Shield, after the interest generated from England's tour of New Zealand in 1934–35. Hallyburton Johnstone, from Auckland, gave a trophy to Auckland and any other team was allowed to challenge them for the title. The first match was played in February 1936, with Wellington beating Auckland by 10 wickets.

From then until 1945–46, the tournament was played on a "challenge basis", with teams challenging the holders of the title. In 1946–47 the tournament was played as a round-robin tournament and renamed simply the Hallyburton Johnstone Shield, with 4 teams competing: Auckland, Wellington, Canterbury and Otago. Matches at this point were mainly 2-day games, with some years using 3- or 4-day matches. North Shore joined the competition in 1965–66 and Central Districts joined in 1979–80. In 1981–82, they played 60-over matches as preparation for the World Cup that year.

In 1982–83 the tournament was renamed the Hansells Cup. In 1983–84, Southern Districts replaced Otago for five seasons, and then afterwards the tournament went back to 5 teams competing. In 1990–91, the tournament was renamed the Pub Charities National Tournament and from  onwards matches have always been 50-over games. Canterbury dominated this period, winning 20 out of 21 titles between 1978–79 and 1998–99.

In this period, various new teams competed: Canterbury B played for two seasons in 1990–91 and 1991–92 before being replaced by a Pub Charities XI for four seasons. North Shore were replaced by North Harbour in 1990–91, who competed until 1993–94. In 1992–93, a final was added for the top two teams in the group stage: prior to this, the winner of the group was the overall winner.

From , the tournament became the State Insurance Cup, and then the State League from 2001–02 to 2008–09. The competition was named the Action Cricket Cup in 2010–11 and 2011–12 and the New Zealand Women's One-Day Competition between 2012–13 and 2016–17. From  the tournament name reverted to the Hallyburton Johnstone Shield.

From , the Twenty20 Super Smash began, and games from both tournaments were often played over the same weekend.

Canterbury (39 titles), Auckland (20 titles) and Wellington (18 titles) have been the most dominant sides in the history of the competition. North Shore won 3 titles between 1968–69 and 1971–72 and Central Districts have also won 3 titles, with their first coming in 2005–06. Otago have won three titles, in 1964–65, 2013–14 and 2021–22.

Tournament names

Teams

The Canterbury and Wellington totals include one shared title.

Results

See also

 Plunket Shield
 The Ford Trophy
 Men's Super Smash
 Women's Super Smash

Notes

References

Hallyburton Johnstone Shield
New Zealand domestic cricket competitions
Women's cricket competitions in New Zealand
Recurring sporting events established in 1936
1936 establishments in New Zealand
Limited overs cricket